Ammuguda is a revenue village in Malkajgiri Mandal and also a part of 8th ward, Secunderbad Cantonment Board , Urban sprawling of Secunderabad City in the Indian state of Telangana. It is located in Malkajgiri Mandal in Medchal district of the state. It is located in the North-East Part of Malkajgiri Mandal, Earlier it was a part Kapra Circle, then after districts reformed it added into Malkajgiri Mandal & Circle in 2017.
It is a part of the Greater Hyderabad and also Hyderabad Metropolitan Region.

Transportation
Ammuguda is well connected with rail and roads.
 Ammuguda railway station is in between Secunderabad JN - Bollarum Station Route

Telangana